Cross-country skiing at the 2011 Canada Winter Games was at Ski Martock near Windsor, Nova Scotia.  It was held from the 21 to 26 February.  There were 20 events of cross country skiing.

Medal table
The following is the medal table for alpine skiing at the 2011 Canada Winter Games.

Men's events

Men's para events

Women's events

Women's para events

References

External links 
The Results

2011 Canada Winter Games